Maren Weigel  (born 22 May 1994) is a German female handball player for TuS Metzingen and the German national team.

She participated at the 2018 European Women's Handball Championship.

International honours 
EHF Cup:
Finalist: 2016

References

External links

1994 births
Living people
German female handball players
Sportspeople from Stuttgart
21st-century German women